Cataclysta quintula is a Crambidae species in the genus Cataclysta. It was described by Edward Meyrick in 1938, and is known from Java in Indonesia.

References

Moths described in 1938
Acentropinae